Purwodadi is a district (Indonesian: Kecamatan) of Purworejo Regency, Central Java, Indonesia.

References

External links 

Districts of Central Java
Purworejo Regency